SIAT station is a station on Line 6 Branch of the Shenzhen Metro. It opened on 28 November 2022. Its name is derived from the nearby Shenzhen Institute of Advanced Technology, Chinese Academy of Sciences.

Station layout

Exits

References

Shenzhen Metro stations
Railway stations in Guangdong
Railway stations in China opened in 2022